Thomas "Tom" Joseph Welling (born April 26, 1977) is an American actor, director, producer, and model. He is best known for his role as Clark Kent in The WB/The CW superhero drama Smallville (2001–2011). He also co-starred in the third season of Fox fantasy comedy-drama Lucifer as Lt. Marcus Pierce/Cain (2017–2018).

A high school athlete, Welling initially worked in construction and, in 1998, he successfully modeled men's clothing for several popular brands. In 2000, he made a successful transition to television. He has been nominated and received several awards for his role as Clark Kent. In 2001, he had a recurring role as Rob "Karate Rob" Meltzer in the second season of the CBS legal drama Judging Amy. His films include Cheaper by the Dozen (2003), Cheaper by the Dozen 2 (2005), The Fog (2005), Draft Day (2014) and The Choice (2016). He has been cast as Samuel Campbell in the TV series The Winchesters. He has also been involved behind the camera as an executive producer and a director.

Early life 
Welling was born in Putnam Valley, New York. His family moved frequently, making stops in Wisconsin, Delaware, and Michigan. Welling attended Okemos High School in Okemos, Michigan, where he started acting in plays, but then switched to sports. Welling played baseball and soccer, but his favorite sport is basketball. Welling is one of four children, with two older sisters, Rebecca and Jamie, and a younger brother, Mark Welling, who is also an actor.

Career

Early career 
Originally a construction worker, Welling was discovered in 1998 at a party in Nantucket by casting director Jennifer Starr who was there finding fresh faces for a Tommy Hilfiger campaign and suggested he try modeling. Welling modeled for Louisa Modeling Agency until 2000, when he relocated to Los Angeles. There he modeled for Tommy Hilfiger, Abercrombie & Fitch, and Calvin Klein while pursuing an acting career. In 2000, Welling appeared in Angela Via's music video "Picture Perfect" where he played Vía's love interest. Welling has said that he did not like modeling and that he was not good at it because it was all on the outside or from an external point of view. He pursued acting because he wanted to express a range of emotions, but Welling still models occasionally and appeared in the May 2008 issue of Vogue, the so-called Superhero Issue. In his first major acting role, Welling played karate teacher Rob "Karate Rob" Meltzer, a younger love interest of Amy Gray (Amy Brenneman) in the second season of the CBS legal drama Judging Amy, which aired in 2001. Welling was originally signed for three episodes, but after receiving good feedback, the producers kept him for three more. Welling also had a small role in the pilot episode of the UPN science fiction sitcom Special Unit 2, and he appeared in the pilot episode of the short-lived Fox sitcom Undeclared.

Smallville 

Welling was cast in the WB superhero drama Smallville after a nationwide search for an actor to play Clark Kent. In an interview with a teen magazine, Welling spoke about the day he auditioned for the role: "I was on my way back from the Warner Bros. studio, and I stopped in a gas station to call my manager and tell him how it went. I called and got him on the phone and he said, 'Can you hold on a second?' Next thing I know, there are literally seven people on the other line and almost in unison they say, 'Tom, you got it!'" The pilot aired in October 2001 and became the highest-rated debut for The WB, with 8.4 million viewers. Welling told TV Guide that he turned down the lead role twice, but after reading the script, decided to take the job. Like Christopher Reeve, he was not a Superman fan before being cast as Clark Kent. In fact, he said, he continued to not read Superman comics: "I made a conscious decision to stay away from that material. We're doing something different at a time before all that, I don't want that to affect what I'm doing, even subconsciously." He did get the chance to meet two previous Superman actors: Christopher Reeve, who appeared in season 2: episode 17 titled "Rosetta", and Dean Cain, who appeared in season 7: episode 4 titled "Cure".

Welling was named one of People magazine's "Breakthrough Stars of 2001", and also won the Teen Choice Award as "Choice Breakout Star (Male)" in 2002 for his role as Clark Kent. Following the third season, Welling was interviewed by Smallville Magazine and said that if he could play one character on the show that was not Clark Kent, it would be Lex Luthor; "Lex Luthor! I wouldn't mind having my head shaved—as an actor, [it is the ultimate,] getting to play the complete opposite of your character."

In 2003, Welling said he met with director Brett Ratner about potentially playing Clark Kent/Superman in the superhero film Superman Returns (2006), but scheduling conflicted with Smallville. Comic book artist Alex Ross even did two sketches of Welling as the "Man of Steel" to see what the actor would look like in the famous costume. In August 2009, Welling won another Teen Choice Award as "Choice TV Actor (Action Adventure)" for Smallville.

In 2019, Welling reprised his role as Clark Kent in the Batwoman episode of the CW Arrowverse crossover event "Crisis on Infinite Earths", along with his Smallville co-star Erica Durance as Lois Lane. Welling's reprisal concluded his incarnation's story where it showed Clark gave up his powers, retired as an average farmer, and has at least two daughters with Lois.

On July 13, 2022, Welling and fellow Smallville actor Michael Rosenbaum launched the podcast Talkville, where the two co-stars comment on every episode of Smallville.

Lucifer 
In 2017, Welling was cast to co-star in the third season of the Fox fantasy comedy-drama Lucifer. He played Marcus Pierce, a police lieutenant at the precinct and the main antagonist of the season who is the immortal Cain.

Film 
In December 2003, Welling made his feature film debut as Charlie Baker, the oldest son and second-oldest in the Baker family which had 12 children, in the family comedy Cheaper by the Dozen with Steve Martin and Bonnie Hunt, which is a remake of the 1950 movie starring Clifton Webb and Myrna Loy, based on the 1948 book about the family of Frank and Lillian Gilbreth and written by two of their children. Welling talked about why he was interested in the project in an interview with Paul Fischer: "The top three reasons I decided to do this film were, one, Steve Martin, two, Steve Martin and three, Steve Martin. That was the number one draw for me. Then, after reading the script, I really liked this character, Charlie. I liked what he went through, what he had to go through, and I felt I understood where he was coming from. And I just wanted to be a part of it." Welling had always been a fan of Martin's and said that he "absolutely loved" working with him.

In 2005, Welling co-starred in the horror film The Fog, a remake of John Carpenter's 1980 film of the same name, as Nick Castle (a character originally played by Tom Atkins). At the same time The Fog was in production, Welling was still working on the last few episodes of the fourth season of Smallville. The same year, he reprised his role as Charlie Baker in Cheaper by the Dozen 2.

In 2013, Welling was among the all-star cast of the historical drama Parkland, based on the book Reclaiming History: The Assassination of President John F. Kennedy by author Vincent Bugliosi. The story centers on the chaotic events that occurred at Parkland Hospital in Dallas, Texas on the day President John F. Kennedy was assassinated on November 22, 1963. In 2014, Welling co-starred in Ivan Reitman's sports drama Draft Day. He played a veteran quarterback whose career is at a crossroads.

Production 
For Smallvilles ninth season, Welling served as a co-executive producer. He returned as Clark Kent for the show's tenth and final season in Fall 2010 and became a full executive producer, as credited in a May 20, 2010 press release by the CW.

Welling served as an executive producer of the CW comedy-drama Hellcats based on journalist Kate Torgovnick's book Cheer: Inside the Secret World of College Cheerleaders. The series first aired on The CW beginning in the fall of 2010, and was canceled on May 17, 2011. According to Welling, the reason of cancellation was because of the change of CW president of entertainment from Dawn Ostroff to Mark Pedowitz.

Directing 
Welling made his directorial debut in 2006 with the Smallville episode "Fragile" (5.18). He also directed "Hydro" (6.10); the show's 150th episode, "Apocalypse" (7.18); "Injustice" (8.21); the second part ("Legends") of the two-hour episode "Absolute Justice" (9.11); and two episodes of Smallvilles final season, "Patriot" (10.09) and "Booster" (10.18).

 Personal life 
On July 5, 2002, Welling married model Jamie White on Martha's Vineyard with Welling's friends and then-Smallville co-stars Kristin Kreuk and Michael Rosenbaum in attendance. Welling and White resided in Vancouver, British Columbia, but returned to Los Angeles in March 2011. On October 17, 2013, White filed for divorce from Welling. The divorce was finalized in November 2015.

In 2014, Welling began dating equestrian and Saddle Club founder Jessica Rose Lee. In April 2018, they announced their engagement. The couple has two sons, born in January 2019 and June 2021. Welling and Lee married on November 30, 2019, at Sunstone Vineyards & Winery in San Ynez, California.

Welling plays golf in his spare time. Welling has said in YM that he dislikes interviews. He said "I don't want to be a celebrity for the sake of being a celebrity. I want to work and then go home and live in private." Welling has also said he disliked modeling because it was not fulfilling and was not an expressive job.

 Filmography 
 Film 

 Television 

 Crew role 

 Music video 

Awards and nominations

The following is a List of awards and nominations received by Tom Welling''' throughout his acting career.

Nominations
Academy of Science Fiction, Fantasy & Horror Films, USA: 5 nominations, 0 wins
Saturn Award nomination, (2002), Best Actor in a Television Series (Smallville)
Saturn Award nomination, (2003), Best Actor in a Television Series (Smallville)
Saturn Award nomination, (2004), Best Actor in a Television Series (Smallville)
Saturn Award nomination, (2005), Best Actor in a Television Series (Smallville)
Saturn Award nomination, (2006), Best Actor in a Television Series (Smallville)
Teen Choice Awards: 10 nominations, 2 wins
Teen Choice Award nomination (2002), Choice Actor: Drama/Action Adventure (Smallville)
Teen Choice Award won, (2002), Choice Breakout Star: Male (Smallville)
Teen Choice Award nomination, (2003), Choice Actor: Drama/Action Adventure (Smallville)
Teen Choice Award nomination, (2004), Choice Actor: Drama/Action Adventure (Smallville)
Teen Choice Award nomination, (2004), Choice Breakout Star: Male (Cheaper by the Dozen)
Teen Choice Award nomination, (2005), Choice Actor: Drama (Smallville)
Teen Choice Award nomination, (2006), Choice Chemistry (Smallville)
Teen Choice Award nomination, (2006), Choice Actor: Drama/Action Adventure (Smallville)
Teen Choice Award nomination, (2008), Choice Actor: Action (Smallville)
Teen Choice Award won, (2009), Choice Actor: Action (Smallville'')

Awards

References

External links 

Verified Facebook Page

1977 births
Living people
Male actors from New York (state)
American male film actors
Male models from New York (state)
American male television actors
American television directors
People from Janesville, Wisconsin
21st-century American male actors
People from Okemos, Michigan
Television producers from Michigan